Schwarzenbühl Pass (el. 1547 m.) is a high mountain pass in the Alps in the canton of Bern in Switzerland.

It connects Riffenmatt in the municipality of Guggisberg, south of Bern and Gurnigel Pass.

There is a ski resort at the pass, with a hotel with a hot steam bath, a restaurant, and a sanatorium.

See also
 List of highest paved roads in Europe
 List of mountain passes
List of the highest Swiss passes

Mountain passes of Switzerland
Mountain passes of the Alps
Mountain passes of the canton of Bern